Joachim van den Hove (1567? – 1620) was a Flemish/Dutch composer and a lutenist. He composed works for lute solo and for lute and voice. Moreover, he wrote many arrangements for lute of Italian, French, and English vocal and instrumental music, and of Flemish/Dutch folk music. Van den Hove disputes with Adriaensen and Vallet the distinction of being the most important representative of 17th century Dutch lute music.

Van den Hove was born in Antwerp, where his father, Peeter van den Hove, was a respected musician. After the Fall of Antwerp in 1584–5 the family fled north. From at least 1593 to 1616 Joachim lived in Leiden, where in 1594 he married Anna Rodius (originally "de Roy") from Utrecht. There he was a lutenist and also lute teacher. His most famous pupils were the young Frederick Henry, Prince of Orange and Maurice of Nassau, Prince of Orange.

Van den Hove's financial fortunes declined and in 1616 his properties were confiscated. Before his Leiden home was sold by public auction in 1618, he had fled to The Hague, where he died in poverty in 1620. 

Published collections of his works are:
Florida, sive cantiones (Utrecht, 1601)
Delitiae Musicae (Utrecht, 1612)
Praeludia testudinis (Leiden,  1616)

Works in manuscripts:
Christoph Herold - Lautenbuch, 1602
Joachim van den Hove - Lautenbuch, 1615 (Autograph)
Ernst Schele - Tabulaturbuch, 1619

References

 Ralf Jarchow: Ernst Schele - Tabulaturbuch, Jarchow, Glinde 2004/2009 (facsimile and commentary; with many unique works by Hove)
 Ralf Jarchow: Joachim van den Hove - Lautenbuch, Jarchow, Glinde 2006/2011 (facsimile and commentary; lute tablature by Hove in his own hand)
 Rudolf Rasch (1991). Lute music from the Netherlands, CD booklet, BFO Centre Netherlands Music.
 John H. Robinson: Inventory of lute solos composed or arranged by Joachim van den Hove (Lute News Nr. 44), Lute Society, Guildford 1997
 John H. Robinson: Hove, Joachim van den, (in Grove), Macmillan Publishers Limited, London 2001
 Andreas Schlegel & François-Pierre Goy: Ms. Herold, Padua 1602, Tree-Edition, München 1991 (facsimile and commentary; with many unique works by Hove)
 Godelieve Spiessens: Joachim van den Hove - Præludia Testudinis, Leiden 1616, Bibliotheca Regia Belgica, Brussels 1982 (Facsimile)
 T. Willemze (1981). Componistenlexicon, Deel 2. Het Spectrum, Utrecht. (in Dutch)

1560s births
1620 deaths
17th-century classical composers
Renaissance composers
Dutch Baroque composers
Composers for lute
Lutenists
Male classical composers
Musicians from Antwerp
People from Leiden
Belgian Baroque composers
17th-century male musicians